Jonathan Guy Lewis (born 20 May 1963) is a British actor known for his role as Chris Hammond in London's Burning.

Early life
After attending university, Lewis was an officer trainer at Sandhurst before a recurring back injury led to his discharge from the army at 22 years old. Lewis then enrolled in drama school to begin his new career.

Career
Lewis's first major acting role was the role of Sgt. Chris McCleod in Soldier Soldier. His most recent television series roles were on Skins and Endeavour.

Lewis has also worked as a writer and director. His most notable work as a writer is the award-winning play Our Boys, which was staged at the Donmar Warehouse in 1995 and revived at the Duchess Theatre in 2012. In 2015, Lewis co starred in the revival of Arthur Miller's A View from the Bridge.

Select television works
Holby City, 2003, as Anthony Woods  (3 episodes)
London's Burning, 1998-2001, as Chris Hammond (25 episodes)
Coronation Street, 1999, as Ian Bentley (43 episodes)
Soldier Soldier, 1996–1997, as Sgt Chris McLeod (17 episodes)
 Heartbeat 2005 as Peter Roberts (1 episode) Silent Witness 2006 Series 10 Episodes 9 & 10 Schism Parts 1 & 2 as Interrogator (2 Episodes)

References

External links
 

1963 births
Living people
20th-century English male actors
21st-century English male actors
English male soap opera actors
English male television actors
Male actors from London
People from Woolwich